The Coudé Spectrograph was an instrument attached to the ESO 1.52-metre telescope, 3 camera telescope equipped with photographic plates as detectors. It has two cameras working at f/6 and f/14. Dispersions from 1A/mm to 18a/mm are available with a selection of three gratings, each with ruled areas of 20 x 30 cm.

The Coudé Spectrograph was installed at the coudé focus of the ESO 1.52-metre telescope at the La Silla Observatory in May 1969. It was decommissioned from the ESO 1.52-metre telescope in mid 1980s. The telescope was named after its inventor, Robert G. Tull Coudé.

References

External links 
 Diagram of a Coudé spectrograph.

European Southern Observatory
Telescopes